Janjero may refer to

 Kingdom of Janjero, a former kingdom in Ethiopia
 Yem people, an ethnic group in Ethiopia also known as Janjero
 Yemsa language, a language spoken in Ethiopia